Qiu Yuhan (born July 17, 1998) is a Chinese competitive swimmer.  At the 2012 Summer Olympics in London, she competed for the national team in the Women's 4 × 100 metre freestyle relay, finishing in 4th place in the final.

Personal bests (long course)

References

 
 
 
 

Living people
Swimmers from Liaoning
Olympic swimmers of China
Swimmers at the 2012 Summer Olympics
Chinese female freestyle swimmers
People from Benxi
Swimmers at the 2014 Summer Youth Olympics
World Aquatics Championships medalists in swimming
Medalists at the FINA World Swimming Championships (25 m)
Asian Games medalists in swimming
Swimmers at the 2014 Asian Games
1998 births
Asian Games gold medalists for China
Medalists at the 2014 Asian Games
Youth Olympic gold medalists for China
Chinese lifesaving athletes
21st-century Chinese women